Naratovo (Narat) is a rural locality (a village) in Bolshekachakovsky Selsoviet, Kaltasinsky District, Bashkortostan, Russia. The population was 34 as of 2010. There are 3 streets.

Geography 
Naratovo is located 28 km southeast of Kaltasy (the district's administrative centre) by road. Babayevo is the nearest rural locality.

References 

Rural localities in Kaltasinsky District